James Joseph King (born August 23, 1974) is a politician and former member of the Republican Party in the U.S. State of Maryland. He represented district 33A in Anne Arundel County in the Maryland House of Delegates.

Election results

2006 
Voters to choose two:

References

Living people
Republican Party members of the Maryland House of Delegates
People from Anne Arundel County, Maryland
1974 births
21st-century American politicians